The  is a single-seat fighter flown by the Imperial Japanese Army Air Service in the last two years of World War II. The Ki-84 is generally considered the best Japanese fighter to operate in large numbers during the conflict. The aircraft boasted high speed and excellent maneuverability with an armament (up to two 30 mm and two 20 mm cannon) that gave it formidable firepower. The Ki-84's performance matched that of any single-engine Allied fighter it faced, and its operational ceiling enabled it to intercept high-flying B-29 Superfortress bombers. Pilots and crews in the field learned to take care with the plane's high-maintenance Nakajima Homare engine and a landing gear prone to buckling. The difficulties of Japan's situation late in the war took a toll on the aircraft's field performance as manufacturing defects multiplied, good quality fuel proved difficult to procure, and experienced pilots grew scarce. Nevertheless, a well-maintained Ki-84 was Japan's fastest fighter. A total of 3,514 aircraft were built.

Design and development

Design of the Ki-84 commenced in early 1942 to meet an Imperial Japanese Army Air Service requirement for a replacement to Nakajima's own, earlier Ki-43  fighter, then just entering service. The specification recognized the need to combine the maneuverability of the Ki-43 with performance to match the best western fighters, and heavy firepower. The Ki-84 first flew in March 1943 and deliveries from Nakajima's Ota factory commenced the following month. Although the design was itself solid, growing difficulties in securing skilled pilots, proper fuel and construction materials, and adequate manufacture often prevented the aircraft from reaching its full potential in the field.

The design of the Ki-84 addressed the most common complaints about the popular and highly maneuverable Ki-43: insufficient firepower, poor defensive armor, and lack of climbing speed. The Ki-84 was a cantilever low-wing monoplane of all-metal construction, except for the fabric-covered control surfaces, with conventional landing gear.
Armament comprised two fuselage-mounted, synchronized 12.7 mm (.50 in) machine guns — these proved challenging to synchronize properly with the Hayate's four-blade propeller — and two wing-mounted 20 mm cannon, a considerable improvement over the two 12.7 mm (.50 in) machine guns used in the Ki-43 Hayabusa. Defensive armor offered Hayate pilots better protection than the unsealed wing tanks and light-alloy airframe of the Ki-43. In addition, the Ki-84 used a 65 mm (2.56 in) armor-glass canopy, 13 mm (.51 in) of head and back armor, and multiple bulkheads in the fuselage, which protected both the methanol-water tank (used to increase the effectiveness of the supercharger) and the centrally located fuel tank.

It was the Nakajima firm's own-designed  displacement, Ha-45 Homare ("Praise" or "Honor") air-cooled eighteen-cylinder radial engine, first accepted for military use in 1941, that gave the Hayate its high speed and prowess in combat. Derived from the Nakajima Homare engines common to many Japanese aircraft, the Hayate used several versions of the Homare engine, including the carbureted model 21 and the fuel-injected model 23 versions of the engine. Most Homare engines used water injection to aid the supercharger in giving the Ki-84 a rated 1,491 kW (2,000 hp) at takeoff. This combination theoretically gave it a climb rate and top speed roughly competitive with the top Allied fighters. Initial Hayate testing at Tachikawa in early summer 1943 saw test pilot Lieutenant Funabashi reach a maximum level airspeed of 624 km/h (387 mph) in the second prototype. In 1946, US Technical Intelligence bench-tested a Homare 45, Model 21 engine and verified the engine's maximum horsepower output using 96 octane AvGas, plus methanol injection.

The complicated Ha-45-21 carbureted engine was a compact design (only  larger in diameter than the Ki-43's  14-cylinder Nakajima Sakae radial) that required a great deal of care in construction and maintenance and it became increasingly difficult to maintain the type's designed performance as the Allies advanced toward the Japanese homeland. To compound reliability problems, the Allied submarine blockade prevented delivery of crucial components, such as the landing gear. Many landing gear units were compromised by the poor-quality heat treatment of late-war Japanese steel. As a result, many Hayates suffered strut collapses on landing. Further damage was caused by inadequately trained late war pilots, who sometimes found it difficult to transition to the relatively "hot" Ki-84 from the comparatively docile Ki-43, which had a significantly lower landing speed.

Operational service
The first major operational involvement was during the battle of Leyte at the end of 1944, and from that moment until the end of the Pacific war the Ki-84 was deployed wherever the action was intense. The 22nd Sentai re-equipped with production Hayates. Though it lacked sufficient high-altitude performance, it performed well at medium and low levels. Seeing action against the USAAF 14th Air Force, it quickly gained a reputation as a combat aircraft to be reckoned with. Fighter-bomber models also entered service. On April 15, 1945, 11 Hayates attacked US airfields on Okinawa, destroying many aircraft on the ground.

In the final year of the war the Ki-84, the Ki-100 (essentially a radial-engined version of the inline-powered Kawasaki Ki-61) and Kawanishi's N1K2-J were the three Japanese fighters best suited to combat the newer Allied fighters.

Variants

 Ki-84-a: Prototype.
 Ki-84-b: Evaluation model.
 Ki-84-c: Pre-production model.
 Ki-84-I Ko: Armed with 2 × 12.7 mm Ho-103 machine guns and 2 × 20mm Ho-5 cannons in wings (most widely produced version).
 Ki-84-I Otsu: Armed with 4 × 20 mm Ho-5 cannon. (Limited production run, may not have equipped a full Sentai)
 Ki-84-I Hei: Armed with 2 × 20 mm Ho-5 cannon and 2 × 30 mm Ho-155 cannon in wings.
 Ki-84-I Tei: Night fighter variant of Ki-84 Otsu. Equipped with an additional Ho-5 20mm cannon (300 shells) placed at 45 degree angle behind the cockpit in Schräge Musik configuration. Rare variant, 2 built.
 Ki-84-I Ko - Manshu Type: Manufactured in Manchukuo for Manshūkoku Hikōki Seizo KK by Nakajima License.
 Ki-84-II: Sometimes known as the 'Hayate-Kai', the Ki-84-II had certain duralumin components replaced with ones made of wood and plywood, mainly concerning the rear fuselage, tail unit elements, wing tips, push-pull rods and other, minor components. This model was produced with the designations Ko, Otsu and Hei depending on the armament.
 Ki-84-III: A planned conversion of the Ki-84 into a high-attitude interceptor after development of the Ki-87 prototype was delayed. Replaced the Homare engine with a 2450 hp Nakajima Ha-44 12 Ru air cooled radial engine with a turbo-supercharger mounted under the fuselage. The airframe remained unchanged, aside from the engine mountings to support the larger diameter engine. The airplane did not progress beyond the design stage.
 Ki-84 Sa Go: Oxygen injection system replacing the traditional water-methanol injection system to improve high attitude performance. No prototypes were built.
 Ki-84-N: 1st high-altitude interceptor variant of the Ki-84, with a 2500 hp Nakajima Ha-219 air cooled radial engine and with wing area increased to 249.19 square feet. The Ki-84-N production model was assigned to the Kitai 'Ki-117'. Neither aircraft left the design stage before the war's end. 
 Ki-84-P: 2nd high-altitude interceptor variant of the Ki-84, with a 2500 hp Nakajima Ha-219 air cooled radial engine and with wing area increased to 263.4 square feet. Cancelled in favor of further development of the Ki-84-R, which was proving to be a less ambitious project. 
 Ki-84-R: 3rd high-altitude interceptor variant of the Ki-84, with a 2000 hp Nakajima Ha-45-44 with a mechanically driven two-stage three-speed supercharger. The prototype was 80% completed at war's end.
 Ki-106: Prototype, constructed mainly out of wood. 3 Built.
 Ki-113: Based on the Ki-84 Otsu, with certain steel components on different areas of the aircraft. The project was an attempt to sustain light alloys, which were becoming very scarce later in the war. It employed steel sheet skinning and the cockpit section, ribs, and bulkheads were made of carbon steel.
 Ki-116: Evaluation model, equipped with a Mitsubishi Ha-112-II (Ha-33-62), 1,120 kW (1,500 hp). 1 Built.
 Ki-117: Production designation of the Ki-84N.

Production

Not included:
 Pre-production started with two prototypes completed in March and April 1943. 
 A further 94 Ki-84-I Ko's were assembled at Mansyu Hikoki Seizo K.K. aircraft plant in Harbin.

Operators
Wartime

 Imperial Japanese Army Air Service

Post-war

 People's Liberation Army Air Force operated captured aircraft from 1945 until the 1950s.

 Chinese Nationalist Air Force held some Ki-84 in reserve in case American aid was cut.

 Indonesian Air Force - In 1945, Indonesian People's Security Force (IPSF) (Indonesian pro-independence guerrillas) captured a small number of aircraft at numerous Japanese air bases, including Bugis Air Base in Malang (repatriated 18 September 1945). Most aircraft were destroyed in military conflicts between the Netherlands and the newly proclaimed Republic of Indonesia during the Indonesian National Revolution of 1945–1949.

Surviving aircraft
After the war a number of aircraft were tested by the allied forces, two at the Allied Technical Air Intelligence Unit - South-West Pacific Area (ATAIU-SWPA) as S10 and S17 and a further two in the United States as FE-301 and FE-302 (Later T2-301 and T2-302).

One example captured at Clark Field during 1945, serial number 1446, was transported aboard the USS Long Island aircraft carrier to the United States. In 1952 it was sold off as surplus to Edward Maloney, owner of the Ontario Air Museum (Planes of Fame Air Museum) and restored to flying condition before being returned to Japan for display at the Arashiyama Museum in Kyoto in 1973. With unsupervised access allowed to the aircraft, parts were stolen from the Ki-84, and coupled with the years of neglect it could no longer fly. Following the museum's closure in 1991, the aircraft was transferred to the Tokko Heiwa Kinen-kan Museum, Kagoshima Prefecture, where it still is displayed to this day. It is the only surviving Ki-84.

Gallery

Specifications (Ki-84-Ia)

See also

References

Notes

Citations

Bibliography
 Aeronautical Staff of Aero Publishers Inc. Nakajima Ki-84 (Aero Series 2). Fallbrook, CA: Aero Publishers, Inc., 1965. 
 
 Caruana, Richard J. "The Nakajima Ki-84 Hayate" Article and scale drawings. Scale Aviation Modeller International. Volume 10 Issue 10 October 2004. Bedford, UK.
 
 Francillon, René J. The Nakajima Hayate (Aircraft in Profile, Number 70). Leatherhead, Surrey, UK: Profile Publications, 1966.
 Francillon, René J. Japanese Aircraft of the Pacific War. London: Putnam & Company, 1970 (2nd edition 1979). .
 
 
 

 
 Sakaida, Henry. Japanese Army Air Force Aces 1937–45. Botley, Oxford, UK: Osprey Publishing, 1997. .
 Sims, Edward H. Fighter Tactics and Strategy 1914–1970. Fallbrook, California: Aero Publishers, 1980. .
United States Strategic Bombing Survey Aircraft Division. Nakajima Aircraft Company, Ltd. Corporation Report II, Washington, D.C., 1947.
 Wieliczko, Leszek A. Nakajima Ki-84 Hayate. Lublin, Poland: Kagero, 2005. . (Bilingual Polish/English)
 
 Various Authors. Yon-Shiki Sentoki Hayate (Pacific War No.46). Tokyo, Japan: Gakken, 2004. .

External links

 "Song of Hayate fighter squadron", Nippon News, No. 254. in the official website of NHK.
 USAAF Technical Report about Ki-84

Low-wing aircraft
Ki-084, Nakajima
Ki-084, Nakajima
Ki-084
Single-engined tractor aircraft
Aircraft first flown in 1943